Denis Hegarty (born 27 March 1912, date of death unknown) was a South African sailor. He competed in the 5.5 Metre event at the 1956 Summer Olympics.

References

External links
 

1912 births
Year of death missing
South African male sailors (sport)
Olympic sailors of South Africa
Sailors at the 1956 Summer Olympics – 5.5 Metre
Place of birth missing